The 1989 Idaho Vandals football team represented the University of Idaho in the 1989 NCAA Division I-AA football season. The Vandals, led by first-year head coach John L. Smith, were members of the Big Sky Conference and played their home games at the Kibbie Dome, an indoor facility on campus in Moscow, Idaho.

The Vandals won their third consecutive conference title (fourth in five years), and made the I-AA playoffs for the fifth consecutive season, under a third head coach.

Hired in early January, Smith had been the defensive coordinator and assistant head coach at Idaho for four seasons (1982–85), all under Dennis Erickson, then went with him in the same capacity to Wyoming and Washington State.

Notable games

The Vandals defeated Montana, their only conference loss the previous season, on a Thursday night in the Kibbie Dome in late September, televised by ESPN. Idaho beat Nevada for the third straight year, only the fourth time in the twelve meetings since the Wolf Pack joined the Big Sky in 1979. The Vandals defeated rival Boise State for the eighth consecutive year, the eighth of twelve straight over the Broncos before a record crowd of 17,600 in the Kibbie Dome.

Division I-AA playoffs
For the fifth consecutive season, Idaho returned to the 16-team I-AA  playoffs. The Vandals, on a nine-game winning streak, hosted Eastern Illinois at home but lost   The game was played before a sparse crowd at the Kibbie Dome two days after Thanksgiving and ended the Vandals' season at

Notable players
The 1989 team included John Friesz, a future collegiate hall of fame quarterback as a three-year starter  Friesz was the winner of the Walter Payton Award in 1989, and was selected by the San Diego Chargers in the 1990 NFL Draft.  He was in the NFL for the next decade with four teams.

Schedule

Roster

All-conference
Quarterback John Friesz was named to the all-conference team for a third consecutive year.  He was joined by center Steve Unger, guard Troy Wright, wide receiver Lee Allen, defensive end Mike Zeller, linebacker Roger Cecil, and cornerback Charlie Oliver. Second team selections included wide receiver Kasey Dunn, tackles Todd Neu and Chuck Yarbro, linebacker John Rust, and safety Brian Smith.

Friesz was the Big Sky's outstanding offensive player for a third straight year, repeated as a first-team Kodak All-American in Division  and won the Walter Payton Award.

NFL Draft
One Vandal senior was selected in the 1990 NFL Draft, which lasted twelve rounds (332 selections).

List of Idaho Vandals in the NFL Draft

References

External links
Gem of the Mountains: 1990 University of Idaho yearbook – 1989 football season
Idaho Argonaut – student newspaper – 1989 editions

Idaho
Idaho Vandals football seasons
Big Sky Conference football champion seasons
Idaho Vandals football